This list of emergency medicine courses contains programs often required to be taken by emergency medical providers, including emergency medical technicians, paramedics, and emergency physicians.

Prehospital 
 Prehospital Emergency Care Course (PhEC)
 Prehospital Trauma Life Support (PHTLS)

Medicine 
 Advanced Cardiac Life Support (ACLS) 
 Advanced Medical Life Support (AMLS) 
 FP-C (Flight Paramedic) 
 Hospital and Emergency Procedures CME courses

Pediatrics and obstetrics 
 Advanced Life Support in Obstetrics (ALSO) 
 Emergency Pediatric Care (EPC) 
 Neonatal Resuscitation Program (NRP) 
 Pediatric Advanced Life Support (PALS) 
 Pediatric Education for Prehospital Professionals (PEPP) 
 Emergency Nursing Pediatric Course (ENPC)

Trauma 
 Advanced Trauma Life Support (ATLS) 
 Anaesthesia Trauma and Critical Care (ATACC) 
 International Trauma Life Support (ITLS)  (formerly Basic Trauma Life Support)
 European Trauma Course (ETC)
 Trauma Nursing Core Course (TNCC) 
 Battlefield Advanced Trauma Life Support (BATLS)

Ambulance operations 
 Coaching the Emergency Vehicle Operator (CEVO) 
 Emergency Vehicle Operations Course (EVOC)

HazMat 
 Basic Hazmat Life Support (BHLS) 
 Advanced Hazmat Life Support (AHLS)

See also
 Emergency medical services
 Emergency medicine

References

Emergency medicine courses